Alind Ferhati (born 20 January 1994) is an Albanian footballer who plays as a forward.

Playing career 
Ferhati played in the Albanian Superliga with FK Dinamo Tirana. In 2014, he played with KF Ada Velipojë, and later with Besëlidhja Lezhë. In 2019, he played abroad in the Canadian Soccer League with SC Real Mississauga.

References

1994 births
Living people
Footballers from Shkodër
Albanian footballers
Association football forwards
FK Dinamo Tirana players
KS Ada Velipojë players
Besëlidhja Lezhë players
Kategoria e Parë players
Albanian expatriate sportspeople in Italy
Canadian Soccer League (1998–present) players